Who I Am is the third studio album by British singer-songwriter Beverley Knight. It was released by Parlophone Records on 29 March 2002 in the United Kingdom. The album entered the UK Albums Chart at number 7, becoming Knight's first top ten album. It went on to be certified gold by the British Phonographic Industry (BPI), and earned Knight several awards nominations, most notably the prestigious Mercury Music Prize in 2002, and Best British Female and Best Urban Act at the 2003 BRIT Awards.

Critical reception

Who I Am received generally favorable reviews from music critics. Allmusic editor Jon O'Brien rated the album four out of five stars, calling it "a well-produced collection of contemporary R&B songs that is just as confident and self-assured as her more celebrated US contemporaries." He found that "overall, Who I Am is still a colossal leap. After seven years of being an also-ran, Knight now has the material to back up her world-class vocals. The big time surely awaits." In her review for The Guardian, Caroline Sullivan  wrote that "every song bubbles with the kind of expensive, polished confidence that often eludes British contenders, and she sings with the poise of an artist at the height of her powers [...] The one thing missing from this luscious album is a killer single, which may keep it from achieving the success it deserves." The Independent found that "the album as a whole [is] marked by an impressive restraint that's far more persuasive than the ghastly histrionics of her American peers."

Track listing

Charts

Weekly charts

Year-end charts

Certifications

References

2002 albums
Beverley Knight albums
Albums produced by Wyclef Jean
Albums produced by Jerry Duplessis